Habrotrocha is a genus of bdelloid rotifers. 

Late Eocene fossils of Habrotrocha in Dominican amber are among the oldest known fossil rotiferans.

References

Rotifer genera
Bdelloidea